The City of Healdsburg has officially recognized Healdsburg Designated Historic Structures and Districts.  In 1983, 339 buildings were identified as historic resources. Subsequently, eleven structures and two districts were formally identified as historically significant and placed on the City's published lists by the Historic Committee and the Healdsburg City Council.

 List of Designated Historic Structures and Districts in Healdsburg

References

See also
 California Historical Landmarks in Sonoma County, California
 List of cemeteries in Sonoma County, California
 List of National Historic Landmarks in California
 National Register of Historic Places listings in Sonoma County, California
 Sonoma County Historic Landmarks and Districts

Tourist attractions in Sonoma County, California